Fagundes Varela is a municipality in the state of Rio Grande do Sul, Brazil. It lies at an elevation of 610 m, covers an area of 132.32 km², and has a population of 2,741 (2020 estimate).

See also

 List of municipalities in Rio Grande do Sul

References

Municipalities in Rio Grande do Sul